Henri Génès (2 July 1919 – 22 August 2005) was a French singer and actor who appeared in such films as The Sucker, La Grande Vadrouille, The Brain, The Counterfeit Constable, and The Little Bather. He was born in Tarbes, and died, aged 86, in Saint-Cloud.

Partial filmography

 Hanged Man's Farm (1945) – Jérôme
 Plume la poule (1947)
 The Chocolate Girl (1949) – Félicien Bédarride
 We Will All Go to Paris (1950) – Julien
 Pigalle-Saint-Germain-des-Prés (1950) – Gustave dit Tatave
 Les amants de Bras-Mort (1951) – Nestor
 Paris Is Always Paris (1951) – Paul Gremier
 Nous irons à Monte Carlo (1951) – Antoine Lacassagne
 A Hundred Francs a Second (1953) – Fernand
 Une fille dans le soleil (1953) – Virgile
 Au diable la vertu (1953) – Pierre Montabrel
 Jeunes mariés (1953) – Le garagiste
 Les détectives du dimanche (1953) – Molot
 L'Œil en coulisses (1953) – Tonin Bonafous
 Women of Paris (1953) – Lucien Mosca, le patron du Ruban Bleu
 Soirs de Paris (1954) – Tino Carivari
 Queen Margot (1954) – Annibal de Coconas
 La rue des bouches peintes (1955) – Philippe Jacquemod
 Trois de la Canebière (1956) – Girelle
 Ces sacrées vacances (1956) – Le brigadier de gendarmerie
 Coup dur chez les mous (1956) – Ernest Mamourette
 Three Sailors (1957) – Honoré
 The Counterfeit Constable (1964) – Gros Max
 The Sucker (1965) – Martial
 La Grande Vadrouille (1966) – L'employé du zoo
 Le Petit Baigneur (1968) – Le paysan
 The Brain (1969) – Le gardien-chef de la prison de Poissy
 Les gros malins (1969) – Docteur Vergeze
 L'homme qui vient de la nuit (1971) – André
 Le rallye des joyeuses (1974) – Le paysan
 Young Casanova (1974) – Maxime Lavaux
 En grandes pompes (1974) – Henri
 Animal (1977) – Camille, le patron du bistrot
 Ça va pas la tête (1978) – L'oncle
 Embraye bidasse... ça fume (1978) – Le capitaine
 The Gendarme and the Extra-Terrestrials (1979) – Le patron du restaurant 'Le Cabanon'
 L'avare (1980) – Le commissaire
 Sacrés gendarmes (1980) – Le curé
 Touch' pas à mon biniou (1980) – Riton
 Prends ta rolls et va pointer (1981) – Le douanier à l'accent
 The Cabbage Soup (1981) – le brigadier chef
 Mon Curé Chez les Nudistes (1982) – Truffard
 Le braconnier de Dieu (1983) – Le patron du 'Café de la paix'
 Vive la sociale! (1983) – Monsieur Armand
 Waiter! (1983) – Sangali
 Y'a pas le feu... (1985) – Le maire
 Le facteur de Saint-Tropez (1985) – L'adjudant Antonin Ficelle
 La fille des collines (1990) – Le maire
 Le provincial (1990) – L'abbé
 L'écrou (1991)
 Justinien Trouvé, ou le bâtard de Dieu (1993) – Grand Vigilant (final film role)

External links 
 
 Fragments d'un dictionnaire amoureux

French male film actors
1919 births
2005 deaths
People from Tarbes
20th-century French male singers